The Usdan Summer Camp for the Arts (formally known as the Nathaniel and Suzanne Usdan Center for the Creative and Performing Arts) is a Wheatley Heights, Long Island-based summer day camp, situated on  of woods.

In 1968, Usdan Summer Camp for the Arts opened its gates to 1,000 students.  Today, approximately 1,600 "Usdanites," ages 4–18, from across Long Island, New York City and lower Westchester, attend the camp every year.

Programs and classes 
The camp is organized into divisions based on grade level: Discovery (Pre-K and 1); Partners In the Arts (2 and 3); Junior (4 through 6); and Senior (6 through 12). Students have a choice of classes from the following disciplines: art, chess, dance, creative writing, music, or theater.  They choose a "major" (two 50-minute periods) and a "minor" (one period) activity. The schedule is based around these two activities along with a recreation period, lunch and a daily Usdan Festival Concerts throughout his or her entire three- four- or seven-week camp session.

Over the years, Usdan's curriculum of music, art, dance, and theater has expanded into additional fields of study in the arts. The camp now offers classes including creative writing, video arts, 3D design and printing, chess, jazz and tap dance, nature, organic gardening, fashion design, cartooning, architecture, animation, ukulele and guitar, Quidditch, and more.

In 2016, the camp launched the Usdan Leadership Institute for the Arts. Tailored for Usdan's high school students (current 9th - 12th graders), the program is designed to cultivate thoughtful, independent young artists and the next generation of leaders in the arts. Members receive leadership training twice a week and have the opportunity to mentor younger students or pursue a job position, depending on eligibility, interest, and availability.

Alumni 
Notable alumni include singer and songwriter Mariah Carey, actress Natalie Portman; actress Olivia Thirlby; jazz singer Jane Monheit; actor Larry Saperstein; dancer Dara Adler; TV personality Stacy London; Broadway playwright Michele Lowe; Broadway personality Seth Rudetsky; Juilliard conductor Adam Glaser; children's author Arthur Levine; and members of major American orchestras, and dance and theater companies.

Campus 

The Usdan Campus is composed of 140 acres of woodlands  and, over the camp's five-plus decades, three noted architectural firms have shaped the landscape.

Today, students have access to close to 70 studios and theaters, including the Andrew and Lily McKinley Amphitheater—a 1,000-seat, award-winning campus center that hosts Usdan's daily Festival Concerts. Other major campus buildings include: the Samuel and Lucille Lemberg Drama Center, the Jerrold Ross Discovery Center, and the Maurice B. Hexter Center. The campus also has four modern tennis courts, three large outdoor swimming pools, two yoga platforms, an archery range, a Quidditch field, and a recreation area for basketball and other games.

History
A phrase from the early days of Usdan that remains a camp mantra to this day: "Lose yourself for the summer. Find yourself for a lifetime."

In 2018, the Camp celebrated its 50th anniversary summer.

Leadership and faculty 
The camp was founded in 1968 by Dr. Maurice B. Hexter, the executive vice president of Federation of Jewish Philanthropies;  musician and opera singer Andrew McKinley; along with philanthropist Samuel Lemberg, who provided initial funding for the project.

Mr. McKinley became the camp's founding executive director, a position he held for 16 years.  Upon his retirement, the Usdan Board appointed cellist and educator Dale Lewis as his successor. Mr. Lewis held that role until he stepped down in 2015.  He is currently Executive Director Emeritus.  In 2015, Arts Educator Lauren Brandt Schloss, the camp's current executive director joined Usdan.

Usdan's leadership includes its board of trustees, and a leadership council of Long Island community and business leaders.  As of January 2019, Usdan board of trustees members include: Lillian Z. Cohen (Treasurer); Richard Eisenberg; Roslyn Jaffe; Michele Lowe (Secretary); Robert Nederlander, Jr.;  Lesley Friedman Rosenthal; Dr. Jerrold Ross (Past President); and John Usdan (President).  And Usdan Leadership Council include: Marilyn & Russell Albanese; Shari Alexander; Amanda Fugazy & Scott Brennan; Sheree & James Incorvaia; Angela Jaggar; Irene & Peter J. Klein; Rosemarie Klipper; Kirk Kordeleski; Sandra & Eric Krasnoff; Debra & Dale Lewis; Jane Monheit & Rick Montalbano; Joy & John Racanelli; Jennifer & Jonathan Allan Soros.

Since the center's inception, the board has completed capital campaigns to build state-of-the-art theaters and teaching studios on Usdan's 140-acre woodland campus.

References

External links
 

Huntington, New York
Buildings and structures in Suffolk County, New York
Education in Suffolk County, New York
1968 establishments in New York (state)